also known by  and his Chinese style name  and , was a prince of Ryukyu Kingdom.

He was born to a royal family called Yonagusuku Udun. He was an adopted son of Namihira Chōbu. Later, Chōki became the seventh head of Yonagusuku Udun.

Matthew C. Perry's fleet came to Ryukyu in 1854, and demanded an audience with King Shō Tai at Shuri Castle. Chōki was sent to meet him, and signed Ryukyu–US Treaty of Amity with him.

Makishi Chōchū, Onga Chōkō, Oroku Ryōchū and Prince Tamagawa Chōtatsu were involved in illegal matter in 1859, Chōki was appointed as judge together with Prince Ie Chōchoku, Mabuni Kenyu, Uza Chōshin to interrogate them. This incident was known as Makishi Onga Incident.

Chōki served as sessei from 1861 to 1872.

References

Princes of Ryūkyū
Sessei
People of the Ryukyu Kingdom
Ryukyuan people
19th-century Ryukyuan people